George Ladd  (1828 or 1829 – August 13, 1889) was a private in the Union Army and a Medal of Honor recipient for his role in the American Civil War.

At the age of 35, Ladd enlisted in the Army from Camillus, New York in January 1864. He mustered out with his regiment in August 1865.

Medal of Honor citation
Rank and organization: Private, Company H, 22d New York Cavalry. Place and date: At Waynesboro, Va., March 2, 1865. Entered service at: Carmillus, Onondaga County, N.Y. Birth: Carmillus, N.Y. Date of issue: March 26, 1865.

Citation:

Captured a standard bearer, his flag, horse and equipment.

See also

 List of Medal of Honor recipients
 List of American Civil War Medal of Honor recipients: G–L

References

External links

United States Army Medal of Honor recipients
United States Army soldiers
People from Camillus, New York
People of New York (state) in the American Civil War
1820s births
1889 deaths
Year of birth uncertain
American Civil War recipients of the Medal of Honor